Trichisia is a genus of beetles in the family Carabidae, containing the following species:

 Trichisia azurea (Chaudoir, 1861)  
 Trichisia babaulti (Alluaud, 1914) 
 Trichisia cyanea Schaum, 1854
 Trichisia insularis Schonfeldt, 1890
 Trichisia morio (Laferte-Senectere, 1851) 
 Trichisia nesites Andrewes, 1931 
 Trichisia papuana Csiki, 1907 
 Trichisia rhodesiana Peringuey, 1908 
 Trichisia violacea Jedlicka, 1935

References

Panagaeinae